Mehdiabad-e Olya may refer to:
Mehdiabad-e Olya, Kerman
Mehdiabad-e Olya, Kermanshah